Dudley Metropolitan Borough Council is the local authority for Dudley metropolitan borough. It is more commonly known as Dudley Council or Dudley MBC.

The present authority was formed as a result of further reorganisation of local government in 1974. It incorporates the areas of Dudley, Brierley Hill, Stourbridge and Halesowen.

History 
The council’s origins are from 1865 when it was incorporated as a municipal borough which allowed the development of an elected town council. This consisted of a mayor, alderman and councillors.

In 1888 Dudley Council became a county borough and so the council took responsibility for neighbouring towns and districts.

In April 1966, under the West Midlands order of the borough, Dudley was extended to take in former Brierley Hill and Sedgley Urban Districts as well as parts of the Coseley Urban District.

Governance 

Dudley Council has its main offices in Dudley town centre (where Dudley Council House is located), along with additional smaller offices throughout the borough. The council is made up of 72 councillors representing 24 wards.

On its formation in 1974, the Metropolitan Borough of Dudley was controlled by the Labour Party. Since then the controlling party has frequently changed, sometimes with no political party having a clear majority.

The Tories currently have control of Dudley Council as a majority run administration. After a no overall control result in the previous local elections the Tories gained control of Dudley council in the 2021 local elections.

Wards 
The 24 wards of the Dudley Borough are each represented by 3 councillors. The council groups wards together into 10 Community Forums to enable community engagement.

Members of parliament 
Current members of parliament for constituencies within Dudley MBC area are:

Chief Executives

Mayor of Dudley and Civic Awards 
The Mayor presides over meetings of the full Council to ensure that business is carried out properly and efficiently, with due regard to the rights of Councillors and the interest of the Community. The Mayor of the Borough is elected at the Annual Meeting of the Council (usually in May each year) from the existing elected councillors.

The Mayor also nominates charities they wish to support during their mayoral year and hosts the annual Mayors Ball and Civic Awards. The Civic Awards aim to recognise individuals and groups who make a difference in the borough. Each award is named for a local personality in that field.

 The Frank Foley award for community spirit
 The William Shenstone award for environment
 The Duncan Edwards award for sport
 The Cedric Hardwicke award for arts
 The Thomas Attwood award for education
 The Mike Holder award for business

Civic arms and motto 
Dudley’s coat of arms was designed in 1975. It symbolises each of the authorities that came together to form the present borough. Key themes on the civic arms reflect the area’s pride in its industrial past.

The council adopted “Unity and Progress” as its motto in 1974.

City status bid 
In 2021, the council proposed the borough (rather than simply the town)  of Dudley become a city, as part of the Queen’s Platinum Jubilee celebrations. The bid was unsuccessful, having also been unsuccessful in 2011.

References

Local authorities in the West Midlands (county)
Metropolitan district councils of England
1974 establishments in England
Borough Council